The Angstrom exponent or Ångström exponent is a parameter that describes how the optical thickness of an aerosol typically depends on the wavelength of the light.

Definition
In 1929, the Swedish physicist Anders K. Ångström found that the optical thickness of an aerosol depends on the wavelength of light according to the power law

The parameter  is the Angstrom exponent of the aerosol.

Significance
The Angstrom exponent is inversely related to the average size of the particles in the aerosol: the smaller the particles, the larger the exponent.  For example, cloud droplets are usually large, and thus clouds have very small Angstrom exponent (nearly zero), and  the optical depth does not change with wavelength. That is why clouds appear to be white or grey.  

This relation can be used to estimate the particle size of an aerosol by measuring its optical depth at different wavelengths.

Determining the exponent
In principle, if the optical thickness at one wavelength and the Angstrom exponent are known, the optical thickness can be computed at a different wavelength. In practice, measurements are made of the optical thickness of an aerosol layer at two different wavelengths, and the Angstrom exponent is estimated from these measurements using this formula. The aerosol optical thickness can then be derived at all other wavelengths, within the range of validity of this formula.

For measurements of optical thickness  and  taken at two different wavelengths  and  respectively, the Angstrom exponent is given by

The Angstrom exponent is now routinely estimated by analyzing radiation measurements acquired on Earth Observation platforms, such as AErosol RObotic NETwork, or AERONET.

See also
 Langley extrapolation

References

 IPCC Third Assessment Report, has extensive coverage of aerosol-climate interactions.
 Kuo-nan Liou (2002) An Introduction to Atmospheric Radiation, International Geophysics Series, No. 84, Academic Press, 583 p, .

External links
 Angstrom coefficient page at NASA GSFC.
 AERONET: an international network of sunphotometers measuring aerosol properties.
 Spatial distributions of the Angstrom coefficient as derived from MISR.

Scattering, absorption and radiative transfer (optics)
Atmospheric radiation
Visibility